Diacylglycerol kinase alpha is an enzyme that in humans is encoded by the DGKA gene.

The protein encoded by this gene belongs to the eukaryotic diacylglycerol kinase family. It acts as a modulator that competes with protein kinase C for the second messenger diacylglycerol in intracellular signaling pathways. It also plays an important role in the resynthesis of phosphatidylinositols and phosphorylating diacylglycerol to phosphatidic acid. Alternative splicing occurs at this locus and four transcript variants encoding the same protein have been identified.

References

Further reading

*

External links
 DAG-kinase catalytic (DAGKc) domain in PROSITE

EF-hand-containing proteins